

Royal Duchies

Dukes of Klarjeti 
The Klarjeti (Georgian: კლარჯეთი [kʼlard͡ʒɛtʰi]; Armenian: Կղարջք, Kharjk) was a province of ancient and medieval Georgia, which is now part of Turkey's Artvin Province. Klarjeti, the neighboring province of Tao and several other smaller districts constituted a larger region with shared history and culture conventionally known as Tao-Klarjeti.

Guaramid dynasty

 Guaram I (588–c. 590)
 Stephanus I (c. 590–627)
 Guaram II (684–c. 693)
 Guaram III (c. 693–c. 748)
 Stephanus III (779/780–786)

Dukes of Odzrkhe 
Odzrkhe or Odzrakhe (Georgian: ოძრხე or ოძრახე) was a historic fortified town and the surrounding area in what is now Abastumani, Samtskhe-Javakheti region, southern Georgia. According to medieval Georgian historic tradition, it was founded by the mythic hero Odzrakhos of the Kartlosid line. The ruins of old fortifications are still visible around the site.

Guaramid dynasty

 Guaram I (588–c. 590)
 Stephanus I (c. 590–627)
 Guaram II (684–c. 693)
 Guaram III (c. 693–c. 748)
 Stephanus III (779/780–786)

Dukes of Aragvi
The Duchy of Aragvi was an important fiefdom in medieval and early modern Georgia, strategically located in the upper Aragvi valley, in the foothills of the eastern Greater Caucasus crest, and ruled by a succession of Eristavi ("Dukes") from c. 1380 until being transferred to the royal crown in 1747.

Shaburidze dynasty
c.1380 : Mikheil
c.1430 : Shanshe I
c.1440 : Nugzari I
c.1465–1474 : Vameki I

Sidamoni dynasty
1578–1580 : Iasoni I
1580–1600 : Avtandili I
1600–1618 : Nugzari
1618–1620 : Baaduri I
1620–1629 : Zurabi I,
1630–1635 : David I,
1635–1659 : Zaal I,
1659–1670 : Otari I
1670–1687 : Revazi I
1687–1688 : Iasoni II
1688–1696 : George I
1696–1696 : Baaduri II
1696–1723 : George I
1723–1725 : Otari II
1725–1729 : Teimurazi I
1729–1729 : Revazi II
1729–1731 : Papuna I
1731–1739 : Bardzimi I
1739–1743 : Bezhani
Non-Dynastic
1743–1747 : Givi II, Prince Amilakhvari
1747 : Annexation by the Kingdom of Kakheti

Bagrationi Appanage

1747–1756 : Vakhtang I Bagrationi
1756–1766 : Vacant
1766–1781 : Levan
1782–1801 : Vakhtang II
1801 : annexation by Russia

Dukes of Racha
The Duchy of Racha was an important fiefdom in medieval and early modern Georgia, located in the western province of Racha, in the upper Rioni valley in the foothills of the Greater Caucasus crest, and ruled by a succession of Eristavi ("Dukes") from c. 1050 until being transferred to the royal crown in 1789.

Inasaridze dynasty
1108–1783
1812–1783 Giorgi Duke of Dukes

Kakhaberidze dynasty
 Kakhaber I (died 1088)
 Niania (1088–1120)
 Kakhaber II (1175–1210)
 Kakhaber III (1245–1278)

Chkheidze dynasty
 Ivane (1488–1497)
 Kakhaber IV (1497–1510)
 Shoshita I (1534–1570)
 Papuna I (1651–1661)
 Shoshita II (1661–1684)
 Papuna II (1684–1696)
 Shoshita III (1696–1732)
 Grigol (1732–1743)
 Vakhtang (1743–1750)
 Rostom (1750–1769)
 Anton (1784, 1787–89)
 Giorgi (1784–1787)

Dukes of Kldekari
Duchy of Kldekari was an important fiefdom in the mediaeval Georgia. Ruled by a powerful dynasty of Bagvashi, the duchy existed from 876 to 1103 in the southern Kvemo Kartli province.

Bagvashi dynasty
 Liparit I (876)
 Liparit II (940-960)
  (960-988)
 Liparit III (988-1005)
 Rati II (1005–1021)
 Liparit IV (1021–1059)
 John (Ioane) (1059–1074)
 Liparit V (1074–1095)
 Rati III (1095–1102)

Dukes of Ksani
Duchy of Ksani was an administrative unit in feudal Georgia.

Kvenipneveli dynasty
 Largvel Kvenipneveli
 Shalva I Kvenipneveli, son of Duke Largvel
 Virshel Kvenipneveli, son of Duke Shalva I
 Shalva II Kvenipneveli, Duke 1460–1470
 Elizbar Kvenipneveli
 Iese I Kvenipneveli, Duke 1624–1635
 Iese II Kvenipneveli, Duke 1635–1642
 Shanshe I Kvenipneveli, Duke 1642–1653
 Shalva Kvenipneveli, Duke 1653–1661
 Iese III Kvenipneveli, Duke 1661–1675
 David Kvenipneveli, Duke 1675–1717
 Shanshe, Duke of the Ksani, 1717–1753
 Iulon Bagrationi, born 1760, son of Georgian King Erekle II, Duke 1790–1801, died 1816

Georgia dukes
Dukes
Dukes
Dukes